Gibson is an unincorporated community in Terrebonne Parish, Louisiana, United States. The zip code is 70356. It is part of the Houma–Bayou Cane–Thibodaux Metropolitan Statistical Area.

Geography

Education
Terrebonne Parish School District operates public schools. Gibson Elementary School is located in the community.

References

Unincorporated communities in Terrebonne Parish, Louisiana
Unincorporated communities in Houma – Thibodaux metropolitan area
Unincorporated communities in Louisiana